Yahya Zayd (born 21 June 1996) is a Tanzanian international footballer who plays for Egyptian team Ismaily.

References

Living people
1996 births
Tanzanian footballers
Azam F.C. players
Ismaily SC players
Egyptian Premier League players
Tanzanian expatriate footballers
Expatriate footballers in Egypt
Tanzanian expatriate sportspeople in Egypt
Association football forwards
2019 Africa Cup of Nations players
People from Morogoro Region
Tanzania international footballers